Fontainea rostrata, commonly known as Deep Creek fontainea, is a rainforest tree or shrub endemic to Queensland in Australia. It is listed as "vulnerable" under the Commonwealth Environment Protection and Biodiversity Conservation Act 1999.

The species was formally described in 1985 based on plant material collected to the north of Gympie, Queensland.

References

rostrata
Trees of Australia
Malpighiales of Australia
Flora of Queensland
Vulnerable biota of Queensland